Rangel is one of the 23 municipalities (municipios) of the Venezuelan state of Mérida. Its capital is the town of Mucuchíes. It has four parishes: Cacute, La Toma, Mucurubá, and San Rafael. The municipality is named after the national hero Colonel José Antonio Rangel (1788-1821), who played a prominent role in the Venezuelan War of Independence.

References

Municipalities of Mérida (state)